is a Japanese-language term used in countries in North America and South America to specify the ethnically Japanese children born in the new country to Japanese-born immigrants (who are called ). The  are considered the second generation, and the grandchildren of the Japanese-born immigrants are called , or third generation. ( are Japanese for "one, two, three"; see Japanese numerals.)

History

Although the earliest organized group of Japanese emigrants left Japan centuries ago, and a later group settled in Mexico in 1897, the four largest populations of Japanese immigrants and their descendants live in Brazil, Canada, Peru, and the United States.

American Nisei

Some US Nisei were born after the end of World War II during the baby boom. Most Nisei, however, who were living in the western United States during World War II, were forcibly interned with their parents (Issei) after Executive Order 9066 was promulgated to exclude everyone of Japanese descent from the West Coast areas of California, Oregon, Washington, and Alaska. It has been argued that some Nisei feel caught in a dilemma between their Nisei parents and other Americans. The Nisei of Hawaii had a somewhat different experience.

In the United States, two representative Nisei were Daniel Inouye and Fred Korematsu. Hawaiian-born  was one of many young Nisei men who volunteered to fight in the nation's military when restrictions against Japanese-American enlistment were removed in 1943. Inouye later went on to become a U.S. Senator from Hawaii after it achieved statehood.

 was one of many Japanese-American citizens living on the West Coast who resisted internment during World War II. In 1944, Korematsu lost a U.S. Supreme Court challenge to the wartime internment of Japanese Americans but gained vindication decades later. The Presidential Medal of Freedom, the highest civilian honor in the United States, was awarded to Korematsu in 1998. At the White House award ceremonies, President Bill Clinton explained, "In the long history of our country's constant search for justice, some names of ordinary citizens stand for millions of souls. Plessy, Brown, Parks ... to that distinguished list, today we add the name of Fred Korematsu."

The overwhelming majority of Japanese Americans had reacted to the internment by acquiescing to the government's order, hoping to prove their loyalty as Americans. To them, Korematsu's opposition was treacherous to both his country and his community. Across the span of decades, he was seen as a traitor, a test case, an embarrassment and, finally, a hero.

Brazilian Nisei

Brazil is home to the largest Japanese population outside of Japan, estimated to number more than 1.5 million (including those of mixed-race or mixed-ethnicity), more than that of the 1.2 million in the United States.  The Nisei Japanese Brazilians are an important part of the ethnic minority in that South American nation.

Canadian Nisei

Within Japanese-Canadian communities across Canada, three distinct subgroups developed, each with different sociocultural referents, generational identity, and wartime experiences.

Peruvian Nisei

Among the approximately 80,000 Peruvians of Japanese descent, the Nisei Japanese Peruvians comprise the largest element.

Cultural profile

Generations 
Japanese Americans and Japanese Canadians have special names for each of their generations in North America. These are formed by combining one of the Japanese numbers corresponding to the generation with the Japanese word for generation (sei 世). The Japanese-American and Japanese-Canadian communities have themselves distinguished their members with terms like Issei, Nisei, and Sansei which describe the first, second and third generation of immigrants. The fourth generation is called Yonsei (四世) and the fifth is called  Gosei (五世).  The Issei, Nisei and Sansei generations reflect distinctly different attitudes to authority, gender, non-Japanese involvement, and religious belief and practice, and other matters.  The age when individuals faced the wartime evacuation and internment is the single, most significant factor which explains these variations in their experiences, attitudes and behaviour patterns.

The term Nikkei (日系) encompasses all of the world's Japanese immigrants across generations.  The collective memory of the Issei and older Nisei was an image of Meiji Japan from 1870 through 1911, which contrasted sharply with the Japan that newer immigrants had more recently left.  These differing attitudes, social values and associations with Japan were often incompatible with each other.  In this context, the significant differences in post-war experiences and opportunities did nothing to mitigate the gaps which separated generational perspectives.

The second generation of immigrants, born in Canada or the United States to parents not born in Canada or the United States, is called Nisei (二世).  The Nisei have become part of the general immigrant experience in the United States and Canada to become part of the greater "melting pot" of the United States  and the "mosaic" of Canada.  Some Nisei have resisted being absorbed into the majority society, largely because of their tendency to maintain Japanese interpersonal styles of relationships. 

Most Nisei were educated in Canadian or American school systems where they were taught Canadian or American national values as national citizens of those countries of individualism and citizenship.  When these were taken away in the early 1940s, the Nisei confronted great difficulty in accepting or coming to terms with internment and forced resettlement. Older Nisei tended to identify more closely with the Issei, sharing similar economic and social characteristics.  Older Nisei who had been employed in small businesses, in farming, in fishing or in semi-skilled occupations, tended to remain in blue-collar work.  In contrast, the younger Nisei attended university and college and entered various professions and white-collar employment after the war.  This sharp division in post-war experiences and opportunities exacerbated the gaps between these Nisei.

In North America, since the redress victory in 1988, a significant evolutionary change has occurred.  The Nisei, their parents and their children are changing the way they look at themselves as individuals of Japanese descent in their respective nations of Canada, the United States and Mexico.

There are currently just over one hundred thousand British Japanese, mostly in London; but unlike other Nikkei terms used centered from Japan to distinguish the distance from Japanese nationality elsewhere in the world, these Britons do not conventionally parse their communities in generational terms as Issei, Nisei, or Sansei.

Aging
The kanreki (還暦), a traditional, pre-modern Japanese rite of passage to old age at 60, was sometimes celebrated by the Issei and is now being celebrated by increasing numbers of Nisei. Rituals are enactments of shared meanings, norms, and values; and this  Japanese rite of passage highlights a collective response among the Nisei to the conventional dilemmas of growing older.
Aging is affecting the demographics of the Nisei. According to a 2011 columnist in The Rafu Shimpo of Los Angeles, the obituaries showing the number of Japanese Americans in their 80s and 90s — Nisei, in a word — who are passing is staggering"

Languages
The Japanese-born Issei learned Japanese as their mother tongue, and their success in learning English as a second language was varied.  Most Nisei speak Japanese to some extent, learned from Issei parents, Japanese school, and living in a Japanese community or in the internment camps.  A majority of English-speaking Nisei have retained knowledge of the Japanese language, at least in its spoken form.  Most Sansei speak English as their first language and most marry people of non-Japanese ancestry.

Education

An illustrative point-of-view, as revealed in the poetry of an Issei woman:

Intermarriage
There was relatively little intermarriage during the Nisei generation, partly because the war and the unconstitutional incarceration  of these American citizens intervened
exactly at a time when the group was of marrying age. Identification of them with the enemy by the American public, made them
unpopular and unlikely candidates for interracial marriage.  Besides this, they were thrown, en masse, into concentration camps  with others of
the same ethnicity, causing the majority of Nisei to marry other Nisei.  

Another factor is that anti-miscegenation laws criminalizing interracial marriage, cohabitation, and sex were in effect in many U.S. states until 1967. 

This is why third generation Sansei are mostly still of
the same racial appearance as the Issei, who first immigrated to the U.S.  
The Sansei generation has widely intermarried in the post WWII years, with estimates of such unions at over 60 percent.

History

Internment

When the Canadian and American governments interned West Coast Japanese citizens, Japanese American citizens, and Japanese Canadian citizens in 1942, neither distinguished between American/Canadian-born citizens of Japanese ancestry (Nisei) and their parents, born in Japan but now living in the U.S. or Canada (Issei).

World War II service

Redress

Japanese American redress
In 1978, the Japanese American Citizens League actively began demanding  be taken as redress for harms endured by Japanese Americans during World War II.

In 1980, Congress established the Commission on Wartime Relocation and Internment of Civilians (CWRIC)  The commission report, Personal Justice Denied, condemned the internment as "unjust and motivated by racism rather than real military necessity".

In 1988, U.S. President Ronald Reagan signed the Civil Liberties Act of 1988, which provided for a formal apology and payments of $20,000 for each survivor. The legislation stated that government actions were based on "race prejudice, war hysteria, and a failure of political leadership".  The Civil Liberties Act Amendments of 1992, appropriating an additional $400 million in order to ensure that all remaining internees received their $20,000 redress payments, was signed into law by President George H. W. Bush, who also issued another formal apology from the U.S. government.

Japanese and Japanese Americans who were relocated during WWII were compensated for direct property losses in 1948. These payments were awarded to 82,210 Japanese Americans or their heirs at a cost of $1.6 billion; the program's final disbursement occurred in 1999.

Japanese Canadian redress
In 1983, the National Association of Japanese Canadians (NAJC) mounted a campaign demanding redress for injustices during the war years.  NAJC hired Price Waterhouse to estimate the economic losses to Japanese Canadians resulting from property confiscations and loss of wages due to internment. On the basis of detailed records maintained by the Custodian of Alien Property,  it was determined that the total loss totalled $443 million (in 1986 dollars).

In 1988, Prime Minister Brian Mulroney gave that long-awaited formal apology and the Canadian government began to make good on a compensation package—including $21,000 to all surviving internees, and the re-instatement of Canadian citizenship to those who were deported to Japan.

Life

Politics

Notable individuals 

The number of nisei who have earned some degree of public recognition has continued to increase over time; but the quiet lives of those whose names are known only to family and friends are no less important in understanding the broader narrative of the nikkei.  Although the names highlighted here are over-represented by nisei from North America, the Latin American member countries of the Pan American Nikkei Association (PANA) include Argentina, Bolivia, Brazil, Chile, Colombia, Mexico, Paraguay, Peru, and Uruguay, in addition to the English-speaking  United States and Canada.

 John Fujio Aiso (1909–1987), American military leader, lawyer, and judge
 Sally Amaki, American singer and voice actress based in Tokyo
 Steve Aoki (born 1977), Japanese American electro house musician
 Alberto Fujimori (born 1938), President of Peru, 1990–2000
 Francis Fukuyama (born 1952), philosopher and political economist
 Luiz Gushiken (1950–2013), Brazilian politician and activist
 Barney F. Hajiro (1916–2011), Medal of Honor recipient in World War II
 Mikio Hasemoto (1916–1943), Medal of Honor recipient in World War II recipient in World War II
 Joe Hayashi (1920–1945), Medal of Honor recipient in World War II
 Shizuya Hayashi (1917–2008), Medal of Honor recipient in World War II
 William Hohri (1927–2010), political activist
 James Iha (born 1968), guitarist, member of alternative rock band The Smashing Pumpkins
 Daniel K. Inouye (1924–2012), Senator from Hawaii, Medal of Honor recipient World War II
 Yeiki Kobashigawa (1920–2005), Medal of Honor recipient in World War II
 Yuri Kochiyama (1921–2014), civil rights activist
 Ford Konno (born 1933), Olympic gold medalist (1952, 1952) and silver medalist (1952, 1956) swimmer
 Tommy Kono (1930–2016 ), Olympic gold medalist (1952, 1956) and silver medalist (1960) weightlifter and only lifter to have set world records in four different weightlifting classes
 Robert T. Kuroda (1922–1944), Medal of Honor recipient in World War II
 Ben Kuroki (1917–2015), only Japanese American U.S. Army Air Forces aircrew member to fly combat missions in the Pacific theater in World War II
 Mike Masaoka (1915–1991) leader of the Japanese American Citizens League (JACL)
 Spark Matsunaga (1916–1990), US Senator from Hawaii
 Norman Mineta (1931–2022), former Congressman from California and Secretary of Transportation
 Wataru Misaka (1923–2019), became the first player of Asian descent and the first non-Caucasian to play in the NBA in 1947
 Hiroshi Miyamura (1925–2022), US Medal of Honor recipient in Korean War
 Pat Morita (1932–2005), television and movie actor nominated for the Academy Award for Best Supporting Actor in 1984
 Kaoru Moto (1917–1992), Medal of Honor
 Sadao Munemori (1922–1945), Medal of Honor recipient in World War II
 Kiyoshi K. Muranaga (1922–1944), Medal of Honor recipient in World War II
 Mirai Nagasu (1993– ), U.S. Figure Skating champion in 2008 and Olympic bronze medalist
 Masato Nakae (1917–1998), Medal of Honor recipient in World War II
 Shinyei Nakamine (1920–1944), Medal of Honor recipient in World War II
 William K. Nakamura (1922–1944), Medal of Honor recipient in World War II
 George Nakashima (1905–1990), furniture and cabinetmaker
 Joe M. Nishimoto (1920–1944), Medal of Honor recipient in World War II
 Isamu Noguchi (1904–1988), sculptor and landscape architect
 Allan M. Ohata (1918–1977), Medal of Honor recipient in World War II
 Apolo Anton Ohno (born 1982) Olympic gold (2002, 2006), silver (2002, 2010), and bronze (2006, 2010) medalist speed skater
 John Okada (1923–1971), writer
 James K. Okubo (1920–1967), Medal of Honor recipient in World War II
 Yukio Okutsu (1921–2003), Medal of Honor recipient in World War II
 Frank H. Ono (1923–1980), Medal of Honor recipient in World War II
 Ken Ono (born 1968), mathematician
 Santa J. Ono (born 1962), immunologist, President University of Cincinnati, President University of British Columbia, President University of Michigan
 Kazuo Otani (1918–1944), Medal of Honor recipient in World War II
 Yoshinobu Oyakawa (born 1933), Olympic gold medalist (1952) in swimming
 George T. Sakato (1921–2015), Medal of Honor recipient in World War II
 James Shigeta (1929–2014), an American film and television actor
 Mike Shinoda (born 1977), musician, rapper, singer, songwriter, record producer, graphic designer, manager and film composer. Member of the American band Linkin Park and supplementary group Fort Minor
 Monica Sone (1919–2011), American author of the autobiographical Nisei Daughter 
 David Suzuki (born 1936), Canadian academic, science broadcaster and environmental activist
 Shinkichi Tajiri (1923–2009), sculptor
Atsuko Tanaka (ski jumper) (born 1992), Canadian Olympic ski jumper
 George Takei (born 1937), actor and gay rights activist best known for his role in the television series Star Trek
 Ted T. Tanouye (1919–1944), Medal of Honor recipient in World War II
 Traci Toguchi (born 1974), actress and singer
 Hisaye Yamamoto (1921–2011), author
 Minoru Yamasaki (1912–1986), architect best known for the New York World Trade Center "Twin Towers"
Karl Yoneda (1906–1999), Communist labor activist
 George Yoshia (born 1922), California musician and teacher

See also 
 100th Infantry Battalion (United States)
 442nd Infantry Regiment (United States)
 Asian American
 Asian Canadian
 Go For Broke Monument
 Hyphenated American
 Japanese American Citizens League
 Japanese American internment
 Japanese American National Library
 Japanese American National Museum
 Japanese Brazilian
 Japanese Canadian
 Japanese in the United Kingdom
 Japanese people
 List of Japanese Americans
 Model minority
 Nisei Baseball Research Project
 Pacific Movement of the Eastern World

References

Bibliography
 Dinnerstein, Leonard & Reimers, David M. (1999).  Ethnic Americans: A History of Immigration. New York: Columbia University Press.  
 Hosokawa, Bill. (2002).  Nisei: The Quiet Americans. Boulder: University Press of Colorado 
 Itoh, Keiko. (2001).  The Japanese Community in Pre-War Britain: From Integration to Disintegration. London: Routledge. 
 McLellan, Janet. (1999).  Many Petals of the Lotus: Five Asian Buddhist Communities in Toronto. Toronto: University of Toronto Press. 
 Moulin, Pierre. (2007).   Dachau, Holocaust, and US Samurais: Nisei Soldiers First in Dachau? Bloomington, Indiana: AuthorHouse.  
 Tamura, Eileen & Daniels, Roger. (1994).   Americanization, Acculturation, and Ethnic Identity: The Nisei Generation in Hawaii. Urbana: University of Illinois Press. 
 Yenne, Bill. (2007).  Rising Sons: The Japanese American GIs Who Fought for the United States in World War II. New York: Macmillan. 
 Yoo, David & Daniels, Roger. (1999).  Growing Up Nisei: Race, Generation, and Culture Among Japanese Americans of California, 1924–49. Urbana: University of Illinois Press.

Further reading
 Asahina, Robert. (2007). Just Americans: How Japanese Americans Won a War at Home and Abroad. New York: Gotham Books. 
 Harrington, Joseph D. (1979). Yankee Samurai: The Secret Role of Nisei in America's Pacific Victory Pettigrew Enterprises.  
 McNaughton, James. (2006). Nisei Linguists: Japanese Americans in the Military Intelligence Service During World War II. Washington, D.C. : Department of the Army.
 Moulin, Pierre. (1993). U.S. Samurais in Bruyeres : People of France and Japanese Americans: Incredible Story. Luxembourg: CPL Editions. 
  Sterner, C. Douglas (2008). Go For Broke: The Nisei Warriors of World War II Who Conquered Germany, Japan, and American Bigotry. Clearfield  : Utah American Legacy Historical Press.

External links

 Japanese American National Museum;  JANM generational teas
 Embassy of Japan  in Washington, DC
 Japanese American Citizens League
 Japanese Cultural & Community Center of Northern California
 Japanese American Community and Cultural Center of Southern California
 Japanese American Historical Society
 Densho: The Japanese American Legacy Project
 Japanese American Museum of San Jose, California
 Japanese American Network
 Japanese-American's own companies in USA
 Japanese American Relocation Digital Archives 
 Online Archive of the Japanese American Relocation during World War II
 Photo Exhibit of Japanese American community in Florida
 Nikkei Federation
 Discover Nikkei
 Summary of a panel discussion on changing Japanese American identities
 The War: Fighting for Democracy: Japanese Americans 
"The War Relocation Centers of World War II: When Fear Was Stronger than Justice", a National Park Service Teaching with Historic Places (TwHP) lesson plan
 U.S. Government interned Japanese from Latin America

Japanese words and phrases
Japanese diaspora
Japanese-American history
Cultural generations
Transitional justice

fr:Nisei